The Northwest Suburban Conference (NWSC) was a high school athletic conference in the northwestern suburbs of Chicago, primarily centered around western Lake County and northwestern Cook County. All of the schools were members of the Illinois High School Association (IHSA).

The conference housed 25 different schools in its 72-year history, with a high turnover rate of schools joining and leaving the conference.  Wauconda was the only consistent member of the NWSC for its entire existence.

History 
The conference was formed in the spring of 1925 with seven original members: Antioch, Arlington, Barrington, Libertyville, Palatine, Warren, and Wauconda.  By 1937, the conference had grown to 13 members with the additions of Leyden in 1926, Bensenville (renamed Fenton in 1955) in 1927, Ela-Vernon (renamed Lake Zurich in 1965) in 1928, Grant and Lake Forest in 1935, and Niles in 1937.  Two years later, membership reduced down to 8 when Arlington, Lake Forest, Leyden, Libertyville, Niles, and Warren left and Northbrook joined, and the conference had a stable lineup for 13 years until 1952.  Grayslake joined in 1952 when Barrington left for the North Suburban Conference and Northbrook closed, but one year later Northbrook's new school Glenbrook opened and joined the conference.  In 1957, Fenton, Glenbrook, and Palatine left to create the Tri County Conference, while Lake Forest and Warren returned and Round Lake joined.

The conference had a stable lineup for 16 years until 1973, when Lake Forest left for the North Suburban and the NWSC added three new members: Cary-Grove, Stevenson, and Woodstock.  With two more additions in 1976, Dundee and Jacobs, the NWSC had 12 members, and the conference was split into North and South divisions for football.  The division format lasted only two seasons, however, as membership reduced down to 8 after Cary-Grove, Dundee, Jacobs, and Woodstock all left in 1978 to create the Fox Valley Conference.

Stevenson left in 1982 to join the North Suburban and was replaced with Johnsburg.  One year later, Antioch and Warren also left to join the North Suburban (Antioch's departure left Wauconda as the sole charter member remaining in the NWSC), and they were replaced with Marengo and Marian Central, the latter being the only private school to ever be a member of the NWSC.  In 1991, Lake Zurich left for the Fox Valley Conference and Marengo left for the Big Northern Conference, leaving the NWSC with only 6 teams for the remainder of its existence.

After Grayslake and Marian Central left in 1997 to join the Fox Valley and Suburban Catholic Conferences, respectively, the NWSC officially folded.  The four remaining members, Grant, Johnsburg, Round Lake, and Wauconda, played the 1997 football season as independents, although unofficially they played a conference schedule where they each played each other twice for a total of 6 conference games.  Johnsburg had joined the Big Northern for all other sports that year and later joined the BNC for football in 1998, while Grant, Round Lake, and Wauconda played all sports as independents until 2000 when they were all accepted into the North Suburban.

From the end of the NWSC until 2006, five schools (Grant, Johnsburg, Marengo, Round Lake, and Wauconda) continued to play tennis together in the "Spirit of the Northwest Suburban Conference" due to the Big Northern Conference (Johnsburg and Marengo's conference at the time) not having tennis as a conference sport.  This conference was not recognized by the IHSA.

All-Time Membership

Membership Timeline

Notes

References 

High school sports in Illinois
Illinois high school sports conferences